Ulam is a surname. Notable people with this surname include:
 Stanislaw Ulam (1909–1984), Polish-American mathematician who participated in the Manhattan Project
 Adam Ulam (1922–2000), Polish-American professor of history and political science at Harvard University, brother of Stanislaw Ulam
 Françoise Aron Ulam (1918-2011), wife of Stanislaw Ulam, part of the Manhattan Project team